Descansos (Spanish: Resting Places) is a 2009 American neo-realist film written and directed by Chris Roybal, his second feature film and first to be released.  The drama features, in neo-realist fashion, an ensemble cast of professional and non-professional actors.

The drama consists of eight vignettes that take you across Northern New Mexico. Following several different characters dealing with love and loss for people who are soon to die or already have died, the film spans Albuquerque, Santa Fe, Nambe, Espanola, Taos, and finally ending at the sacred Santuario de Chimayo.

The film premiered at the National Hispanic Cultural Center on February 6, 2009.

Cast
Among intermittent scenes of The Man (Frederick Aragon) setting down a descanso for each vignette, the eight stories in the picture include:

Marcelina
 Steven Martinez as Archie
 Sylvia Sarmiento as Marcelina

Samantha
 Alex Cosby as Max
 Amelia Ampuero as Samantha
 Rober Gumm as Stem's Customer

Lina
 Genia Michaela as Deb
 Lenore Armijo as Lina
 Rachel Hroncich as Kimberly

Sue
 Eduardo Flores as Gil
 Diego Deane as Juan (Prisoner 060586)

Eva
 Navajo Nguyen as Eva
 Ryan Angell as Dillon
 Angeleah Cuevas as Other Girl

Bella
 Bernardo Gallegos as Nick
 Maggie Fine as Carmella
 Francisco Sandoval as Baby

Grandma
 Everette Scott Ortiz as Zack
 Eppie Guillen as Grandpa
 Regina Sanchez as Grandma

Jessica
 Nichole Otero as Jessica
 David Busse as Jack
 Michael Manzanares as Teenage Boy
 Amber J. Chenault as Teenage Girl

External links
 
 
 DESCANSOS Motion Picture at createspace.

2009 films
2000s Spanish-language films
2009 drama films
American drama films
2000s American films